Guacetisal is a drug that has been used to treat inflammatory respiratory diseases.  Chemically, it is an ester resulting from the combination of aspirin and guaiacol.

References 

Drugs acting on the respiratory system
Salicylate esters
Acetylsalicylic acids
Catechol ethers